Apona mandarina is a moth in the family Eupterotidae. It was described by John Henry Leech in 1898. It is found in central and western China.

Adults vary in ground colour from ashy grey to fawn or dark chestnut.

References

Moths described in 1898
Eupterotinae